This article is about the particular significance of the year 1713 to Wales and its people.

Incumbents
Lord Lieutenant of North Wales (Lord Lieutenant of Anglesey, Caernarvonshire, Denbighshire, Flintshire, Merionethshire, Montgomeryshire) – Hugh Cholmondeley, 1st Earl of Cholmondeley (until 4 September); Other Windsor, 2nd Earl of Plymouth (from 4 September) 
Lord Lieutenant of South Wales (Lord Lieutenant of Glamorgan, Brecknockshire, Cardiganshire, Carmarthenshire, Monmouthshire, Pembrokeshire, Radnorshire) – Thomas Herbert, 8th Earl of Pembroke

Bishop of Bangor – John Evans
Bishop of Llandaff – John Tyler
Bishop of St Asaph – William Fleetwood
Bishop of St Davids – Philip Bisse (until 16 February); Adam Ottley (from 15 March)

Events
January - On the death of John Vaughan, 3rd Earl of Carbery (see Deaths), the Golden Grove estate in Carmarthenshire is inherited by a cousin, John Vaughan (1693–1765), who would rebuild Gelli Aur mansion. 
April - As a result of the death of Edmund Meyrick, a large bequest is left to Jesus College, Oxford, for scholarships for students from Wales. 
21 July - Lady Anne Vaughan, heiress of the Earl of Carbery, marries Charles Powlett, 3rd Duke of Bolton.
12 November - Following the general election, Sir Humphrey Mackworth is replaced as MP for Cardiganshire by the Whig Thomas Johnes the elder, after a scandal involving the collapse of his Company of Mine Adventures; in the same year, forms the Company of Mineral Manufacturers which remains in business for only six years.

Arts and literature

New books

Births
21 March - Francis Lewis, merchant, signatory of the United States Declaration of Independence (died 1803)
1 August - Richard Wilson, painter (died 1782)
December - Josiah Tucker, economist (died 1799)
date unknown - Sir John Glynne, 6th Baronet (died 1777)

Deaths
12 January - John Vaughan, 3rd Earl of Carbery, owner of the Golden Grove estate in Carmarthenshire, 73
24 April - Edmund Meyrick, priest and educational benefactor, 77 
15 November - Catherine Philipps (née Darcy) of Picton Castle, second wife of Sir Erasmus Philipps, 3rd Baronet,  and granddaughter of Philip Stanhope, 1st Earl of Chesterfield
31 December - Edward Proger, politician, 92 or 95

See also
1713 in Scotland

References

1710s in Wales
Years of the 18th century in Wales